Tim Sandlin (born 1950) is an American novelist and screenwriter.

Born in Oklahoma, Sandlin spent his early summers in Wyoming while his father worked seasonally for Grand Teton National Park. Sandlin worked over 40 entry-level jobs including driving an ice cream truck, skinning elk, cooking in a Chinese restaurant, trail inventory for the Forest Service, caretaker of rental cabins, gardener for the Rockefellers, pizza parlor manager, belt buckle buffer, and multiple dishwashing jobs. Throughout this period he lived most of the year on public lands, first in a tent and later in a Cheyenne tipi. He has published 10 novels and a book of columns. Three of his books, Skipped Parts, Sorrow Floats, and Sex and Sunsets, have been produced as movies. His other novels include Western Swing, Rowdy in Paris, Honey Don’t, Lydia, The Fable of Bing, Social Blunders, Jimi Hendrix Turns Eighty, and The Pyms, Unauthorized Tales of Jackson Hole. He has also written 11 screenplays for hire. Sex and Sunsets served as the basis for the screenplay of the 2013 Canadian film The Right Kind of Wrong. Jimi Hendrix Turns Eighty and Rowdy in Paris are in pre-production for movies.

He lives in Jackson, Wyoming with his wife, Carol, and daughter, Leila.

Bibliography

Novels
 Sex and Sunsets, 1987, current reprint by Sourcebooks Landmark
 Western Swing, 1988, current reprint by Sourcebooks Landmark
 Skipped Parts, 1992, current reprint by Sourcebooks Landmark
 Sorrow Floats, 1992, current reprint by Sourcebooks Landmark
 Social Blunders, 1997, current reprint by Sourcebooks Landmark
 Lydia, 2011, current, Sourcebooks Landmark
 Honey Don't, G.P. Putnam's Sons, 2003, 
  Jimi Hendrix Turns Eighty, current reprint by Oothoon Press 2014
 The Fable of Bing, Oothoon Press, 2014, ISBN 9780989395755
 The Pyms: Unauthorized Tales of Jackson Hole", Oothoon Press, 1991

 
 
 Lydia, Sourcebooks Landmark, 2011, 

EssaysThe Pyms: Unauthorized Tales of Jackson Hole, Jackson Hole Magazine, 1991
 Somewhat True Tales of Jackson Hole'', Bluechip Publishers, 2021

References

External links
 Sandlin's official homepage
 Author's blog
 "An Interview with Tim Sandlin", Bookslut, January 2007
 "Tim Sandlin: Author Interview by Nannette Croce", Rose and Thorns, April 01, 2008
 "Tim Sandlin", Penguin.com

20th-century American novelists
21st-century American novelists
American male novelists
1950 births
Living people
Novelists from Oklahoma
20th-century American male writers
21st-century American male writers